Arctoprionites is a genus of extinct ammonites (s.l.) from the Triassic, belonging to the ceratitid family Prionitidae. It has been found in Canada in British Columbia, in Japan, Kazakhstan, and in the U.S. in Nevada.

References 

 Arctoprionites-Paleodb

Ceratitida genera
Triassic ammonites of North America